John Henry Tihen (July 14, 1861 – January 14, 1940) was an American prelate of the Roman Catholic Church. He served as bishop of the Diocese of Lincoln in Nebraska (1911–1917) and as bishop of the Diocese of Denver in Colorado (1917–1931).

Biography

Early life 
John Tihen was born in Oldenburg, Indiana, to Herman Bernard and Angela (née Bruns) Tihen, both German immigrants. When he was still a child, he and his family moved to Jefferson City, Missouri, where he attended parochial schools. After graduating from St. Benedict College in Atchison, Kansas, he entered St. Francis Seminary at Milwaukee, Wisconsin, in 1882.

Priesthood 
Tihen was ordained to the priesthood by Archbishop Michael Heiss on April 26, 1886. Returning to Missouri, he then served as a curate at St. John's Parish in St. Louis.  In   1888, he followed Bishop John Hennessy to the Diocese of Wichita. Tihen there served as rector of the cathedral and chancellor of the diocese. In 1907, Tihen was named vicar general and a domestic prelate.

Bishop of Lincoln 
On May 12, 1911, Tihen was appointed the second bishop of the Diocese of Lincoln by Pope Pius X. He received his episcopal consecration on July 6, 1911, from Bishop Hennessy, with Bishops Nicholas Matz and Richard Scannell serving as co-consecrators.

Bishop of Denver 
Following the death of Bishop Matz, Tihen was named the third bishop of the Diocese of Denver by Pope Benedict XV on September 21, 1917. He was installed on December 21, 1917. 

During World War I, Tihen supported Liberty bonds and the National Catholic War Council, and organized students at Catholic schools as the U.S. Boys Working Reserve and the Children's Red Cross Campaign. In recognition of his support for the war effort, he was appointed by Mayor W. F. R. Mills as a delegate to the Mid-Continent Congress of the League of Nations in February 1919. Tihen was forced to defend the church in Colorado from the powerful Ku Klux Klan, which he condemned as "an anti-Catholic and un-American society." He also supported women's suffrage and the labor movement, and founded The Denver Catholic Register in 1905. 

During his tenure, Tihen organized the diocesan Catholic Charities; increased the number of parochial schools from 31 to 49, and the number of priests from 174 to 229; dedicated 41 churches; and established Loretto Heights College, three hospitals, an orphanage, and a home for the aged.

Retirement and legacy 
On January 6, 1931, Pope Pius XI accepted Tihen's resignation as bishop of Denver and appointed him Titular Bishop of Bosana. In September 1931, he left Denver to take up residence at St. Francis Hospital in Wichita. Kansas. He became an invalid in March 1938, when he suffered a paralytic stroke. Tihen died on January 14, 1940, at age 78, and was buried at Mount Olivet Cemetery in Wheat Ridge, Colorado.

References

1861 births
1940 deaths
People from Franklin County, Indiana
Benedictine College alumni
St. Francis Seminary (Wisconsin) alumni
Roman Catholic Diocese of Wichita
Roman Catholic bishops of Lincoln
Roman Catholic bishops of Denver
20th-century Roman Catholic bishops in the United States
Roman Catholic Archdiocese of St. Louis
Catholics from Indiana
American people of German descent